Dnyandeo is an Indian masculine given name. Notable people with the surname include:

 D. Y. Patil (Dnyandeo Yashwantrao Patil, born 1935), Governor of Bihar state in eastern India
 Satej Dnyandeo Patil (born 1972), Indian politician

Indian masculine given names